Coty Clarke (born July 4, 1992) is an American professional basketball who played for Nagoya Diamond Dolphins of the B.League. He played college basketball for Lawson State CC and Arkansas.

College career
After attending Pinson Valley High School, Clarke began his college career at Lawson State CC where he averaged 12.8 points and 12.1 rebounds per game. After transferring to Arkansas as a junior, Clarke averaged during 8.6 points and 5.5 rebounds in 64 games including 43 starts in two years becoming just the fifth player in program history to accumulate 500 points, 300 rebounds, 100 assists and 100 steals over a two-year span. As a senior, he averaged 9.4 points and 5.6 rebounds in 22.3 minutes per game.

Professional career

2014–15 season
After going undrafted on the 2014 NBA draft, on August 19, 2014, Clarke signed a one-year contract with Hapoel Kazrin/Galil Elyon of the Liga Leumit, the second tier league in Israel. In a year with the Israeli outfit, Clarke nearly averaged a double-double, producing 19 points, 9.4 rebounds, 3.6 assists and 1.5 steals per game, leading the team to the semifinals.

2015–16 season
On September 25, 2015, Clarke signed with the Boston Celtics. However, he was later waived by the team on October 20 after appearing in one preseason game. On October 31, he was acquired by the Maine Red Claws of the NBA Development League as an affiliate player of the Celtics. On November 12, he made his debut for the Red Claws in a 105–103 loss to the Westchester Knicks, recording five points, one rebound and one steal in 18 minutes.

On March 7, 2016, Clarke signed to a 10-day contract with the Celtics. On March 10, he was assigned back down to the Red Claws, earning a recall the next day. He made his NBA debut on March 15, recording three points and one rebound in three minutes off the bench in the Celtics' 103–98 loss to the Indiana Pacers. On March 18, he signed a second 10-day contract with the Celtics. On March 23, he was reassigned to Maine, earning a recall three days later. He was not retained by the Celtics following the expiration of his second 10-day contract. On March 29, he was reacquired by the Red Claws. At the season's end, he was named to the All-NBA D-League Second Team.

On April 30, 2016, Clarke signed with the Capitanes de Arecibo of the Puerto Rican League. On May 2, he made his debut for the Capitanes in a 102–65 win over the Indios de Mayagüez, recording 14 points, four rebounds, eight assists and three blocks in 33 minutes.

2016–17 season
On July 23, 2016, Clarke signed with Russian club UNICS Kazan for the 2016–17 season. On May 27, 2017, he re-joined the Capitanes de Arecibo for the rest of the 2017 BSN season.

2017–18 season
On June 20, 2017, Clarke signed with Russian club Avtodor Saratov for the 2017–18 season.

2018–19 season
On May 30, 2018, he signed with Montenegrin basketball club Budućnost VOLI.

2019–20 season
On September 9, 2019, it was reported that Clarke was added to roster of BC Astana. He parted ways from the team on January 6, 2020, after averaging 12.9 points, 5.1 rebounds and 2.6 assists per game. On January 22, 2020, the Piratas de Quebradillas of the Puerto Rican league was reported to have signed Clarke.

2020–21 season
On July 23, 2020, he has signed with Bnei Herzliya of the Israeli Basketball Premier League.

References

External links

 Coty Clarke at aba-liga.com
 Coty Clarke at euroleague.net
 Coty Clarke at nbadleague.com

1992 births
Living people
ABA League players
American expatriate basketball people in Israel
American expatriate basketball people in Kazakhstan
American expatriate basketball people in Montenegro
American expatriate basketball people in Russia
American men's basketball players
Arkansas Razorbacks men's basketball players
Basketball players from Tennessee
BC Astana players
BC Avtodor Saratov players
BC UNICS players
Boston Celtics players
Capitanes de Arecibo players
Forwards (basketball)
Hapoel Galil Elyon players
Junior college men's basketball players in the United States
KK Budućnost players
Maine Red Claws players
People from Antioch, Tennessee
Undrafted National Basketball Association players